Secrets is an Australian television series which screened in 1993 on the ABC. The thirteen part series was centred around "FIRM", a small, secret, government agency dealing with national security in a world where the old lines defining enemies and allies are now blurred. The perils of international organised crime and terrorist group activity have raised the stakes higher than ever before.

Secrets was created by Jay Cook and Peter Gawler, produced by Jill Robb. It was written by Tony Morphett, Graeme Koetsveld, Deborah Cox, Everett De Roche, Tony Kavanagh, Glenda Hambly, John Cundill and Jay Cook. It was directed by Mark Callan, Steve Jodrell, Gary Conway and Kendal Flanagan.

Cast
 Frank Whitten as Tom Jacobs
 Babs McMillan as Virginia Drury
 Tony Poli as Ed Casser
 Michael Fry as David Skelton
 Rachel Griffiths as Sarah Foster
 Marshall Napier as Gary O'Leary

See also 
 List of Australian television series

References

External links
 Secrets at the Australian Television Information Archive

Australian adventure television series
1993 Australian television series debuts
Australian Broadcasting Corporation original programming